The tramezzino (plural ) is a usually triangular Italian sandwich constructed from two slices of soft white bread, with the crusts removed. Popular fillings include tuna, olive, and prosciutto, but many other fillings can be used.

Etymology 
The term tramezzino was coined by Gabriele D'Annunzio to replace the English word sandwich. It is the diminutive of the word tramezzo "in-between" (formed with the addition of the suffix -ino), meant as a half-way between breakfast and lunch, where to eat a break-hungry snack.

History 
The origin of the tramezzino can be found in the Caffè Mulassano in Piazza Castello, Turin, where it was devised in 1925 as an alternative to English tea sandwiches.
In July 19, the newspaper La Cucina Italiana wrote the first official recipe for the sandwich. Tramezzini are also sold in Hungary pre-packaged at railway and subway stations, and are a popular food choice of commuters.

Features 
The tramezzino consists of soft milk bread without crust in a triangular shape, stuffed abundantly in the center. The peculiarity of this Italian specialty is given by the humidity of the bread, which is conferred by the presence of mayonnaise and, in Venice, also by the humid climate of the city. This makes the bread particularly soft. Among the most common fillings are ham with mushrooms, artichokes, cheese; mozzarella and tomato; fish: tuna, salmon, shrimps or crab; salami and boiled egg; rocket and bresaola and chicken and salad.

See also
 List of sandwiches

References

Italian sandwiches
Italian cuisine
Hungarian cuisine